Empress Dowager Yang may refer to:

Yang Huiyu (214–278), empress dowager during Emperor Wu of Jin's reign
Empress Yang Zhi (259–292), empress dowager during Emperor Hui of Jin's reign
Yang Lihua (579-580), empress dowager during Emperor Jing of Northern Zhou's reign

See also
 Empress Yang (disambiguation)

Yang